Haidernagar is one of the administrative blocks of Palamu district, Jharkhand state, India.

History
Haidarnagar was a rajput-dominated region since 1770 when the Mahthan rajputs captured the town. The nawab made a treaty with rajput chief Babu Shiv Dayal Singh. According to the treaty, 24 of 70 villages were granted to Shiv Dayal. The nawabs lost honour and value among the locals. Babu Tapeswari Singh study law from a college in Bihar.His son Biseswar Dayal Singh became a zamindar. He was active in politics and the freedom struggle. He donated acres of lands during the bhoodan gramdan movement of Vinoba Bhave. 

The rajputs in this region still have clout and dominate politics. Bijendra Prasad Singh is the present landlord of Babhandih.

Languages 
Languages spoken there include Asuri, an Austroasiatic language spoken by approximately 17 000 in India, largely in the southern part of Palamu; and Bhojpuri, a tongue in the Bihari language group with almost 40 million speakers, written in both the Devanagari and Kaithi scripts.

See also
 Palamu Loksabha constituency
 Jharkhand Legislative Assembly

References

 Pansa-Sundipur Bridge - Longest Bridge of Jharkhand
 Blocks of Palamu district
 Bridge

Community development blocks in Jharkhand
Community development blocks in Palamu district